This is a list of notable Mexican poets.

A
 Manuel Acuña
 Ignacio Manuel Altamirano
 Pita Amor
 Homero Aridjis

B
 Xhevdet Bajraj
 Marcos E. Becerra
 Alberto Blanco
 Minerva Bloom
 Bocafloja
 Rubén Bonifaz Nuño
 Coral Bracho
 Gabriela Brimmer

C
 Manuel Carpio
 Rosario Castellanos
 Roberto Castillo Udiarte
 Alí Chumacero
 Rosina Conde
 Elsa Cross
 Juana Inés de la Cruz
 Jorge Cuesta

D
 Salvador Díaz Mirón

E
 Genaro Estrada

F
 Isabel Fraire 
 Noé de la Flor Casanova
 Malva Flores

G
 Jesús Gardea
 Pedro Garfias
 Francesca Gargallo
 Francisco González Bocanegra
 Enrique González Martínez
 José Gorostiza
 Carlos Graham
 Rosario María Gutiérrez Eskildsen
 Manuel Gutiérrez Nájera

H
 Natalio Hernández
 Efraín Huerta

L
 Rossy Evelin Lima
 Germán List Arzubide
 Sergio Loo
 Pura López Colomé
 Ricardo López Méndez
 Ramón López Velarde
 Gregorio López

M
 Manuel Maples Arce
 Luis María Martínez
 Arturo Meza
 Margarita Michelena
 José Montalvo
 Francisco Monterde
 Fabio Morabito
 Angelina Muñiz-Huberman

N
 Thelma Nava
 Amado Nervo
 Salvador Novo
 Efrén Núñez Mata

P
 José Emilio Pacheco
 Mario Santiago Papasquiaro
 Octavio Paz
 Carlos Pellicer
 Guillermo Prieto

R
 Alfonso Reyes
 José Rosas Moreno

S
 Jaime Sabines
 Francisco J. Santamaría
 Tomás Segovia
 Francisco Serrano
 Justo Sierra
 Carlos de Sigüenza y Góngora
 Roberto Solis

T
 José Juan Tablada
 Altair Tejeda de Tamez
 José Tlatelpas
 Jaime Torres Bodet
 Julio Torri

V
 Estrella del Valle
 Arqueles Vela
 Xavier Villaurrutia

W
 Sergio Witz

X
 Ramón Xirau

Z
 Gabriel Zaid

See also

 Spanish poetry
 Mexican literature

Mexico
Poets